Glen Campbell Christmas contains seven tracks from That Christmas Feeling (1968), "Silent Night" from The Christmas Sound of Music (1969), "O Holy Night" from Christmas for the '90s, Vol.2 (1990), and the 1972 "I Believe in Christmas" which first appeared on "The Wonderful World of Christmas" (1976).

Track listing

 "The Christmas Song (Merry Christmas To You)" (Mel Torme/Robert Wells) - 2:59
 "It Must Be Getting Close to Christmas" (Sammy Cahn/Jimmy Van Heusen) - 2:25
 "Blue Christmas" (Billy Hayes/Jay Johnson) - 2:33
 "Have Yourself a Merry Little Christmas" (Hugh Martin/Ralph Blane) - 3:03
 "Christmas Is for Children" (Sammy Cahn/Jimmy Van Heusen) - 3:18
 "Pretty Paper" (Willie Nelson) - 2:31
 "I Believe in Christmas" (Tweenes)
 "Christmas Day" (Jimmy Holiday/L. White) - 2:50
 "O Holy Night" (Adolph Adams/John S. Dwight) - 3:56
 "Silent Night" (Joseph Mohr/Franz Gruber)

2000 compilation albums
2000 Christmas albums
Christmas albums by American artists
Christmas compilation albums
Country Christmas albums
Glen Campbell compilation albums
EMI Records compilation albums